Daimler AG produces a number of automobile transmissions.

Mercedes-Benz Manual Transmissions

For manual transmissions G for gearbox and two digits are used. See G56 — 6-speed manual as an example.

Mercedes-Benz Automatic Transmissions

Mercedes-Benz uses the number "720" to currently "725" to identify an automatic transmission.

References

 
Daimler AG transmissions